Live...Animal is a three-track EP containing songs from W.A.S.P.'s live shows from 1984 and 1987.
It was produced solely by Blackie Lawless.

Track listing
All songs written by Blackie Lawless, except for Mississippi Queen by (Corky Laing, Felix Pappalardi, David Rea, Leslie West)

Side A
Animal (Fuck Like a Beast) (recorded live at Long Beach Arena, 10 March 1987)

Side B
Animal (Fuck Like a Beast) (Studio Recording)
D.B. Blues (Unreleased Studio Recording)

The 12" inch was also available in a limited edition posterbag and as a picture disc. The US edition featured the artwork printed over both front and back cover, and the tracks on Side B were replaced by "Hellion" (recorded live at The Lyceum, London, 24 October 1984) and a cover of Mountain's Mississippi Queen, which has since been released on the remastered version of The Last Command. The live version of "Animal" was taken from the same concert where Live...In the Raw was recorded, but can only be found on this release. "D.B. Blues" was previously unreleased at this time, but has since been released on the 1997 re-issue of Inside the Electric Circus.

The EP was released on vinyl, cassette and CD-single versions in the latter half of 1987. It has become relatively rare, but can generally be found on many internet retail sites for a minimal going rate.

References

1987 EPs
W.A.S.P. albums
1987 live albums